Los Asientos is a corregimiento in Pedasí District, Los Santos Province, Panama with a population of 755 as of 2010. Its population as of 1990 was 1,007; its population as of 2000 was 687.

References

Corregimientos of Los Santos Province